Ayumi Hamasaki's Arena Tour 2006 A: (Miss)understood is a Japanese nationwide tour which took place in early 2006. The DVD of the final show in Tokyo was released November 1, 2006.

Ayumi performed most of her songs from (Miss)understood, along with some of her most popular songs such as Evolution, Unite!, and Boys & Girls.

The third disc contains behind-the-scenes footage plus other special feature material.

This DVD has sold over 100,000 physical copies - the first one to do so since  "Ayumi Hamasaki A Museum: 30th Single Collection Live" that was released on February 25, 2004.

Track listing

Disc 1 (Live)
Are You Wake Up?
Born to Be...
Audience
Evolution
Step you
Ladies Night
Alterna
Is This Love?
(Miss)understood
Tasking
Pride
Rainy Day
Startin'
Unite!
Bold & Delicious

Disc 2 (Encore)
Heaven
Teens
Blue Bird
Humming 7/4
Boys & Girls
Beautiful Day

Disc 3 (Special Side)
MC
Off-stage shots collection

References

Ayumi Hamasaki video albums
2006 video albums
Live video albums
2006 live albums